Forsyth Peak is a peak rising to   east of Loewenstein Peak in the Cruzen Range of Victoria Land.  It was named by the New Zealand Geographic Board in 2005 after geologist Jane Forsyth, a member of geological mapping parties in this area during five seasons from 1988, including work at Willett Range, Clare Range and Victoria Valley.

References

Mountains of Victoria Land